Mykola Prystay (born 26 November 1954 in the Ivano-Frankivsk Oblast) is a retired Soviet football player and current Ukrainian coach.

External links
   Profile

1954 births
Living people
Soviet footballers
Ukrainian football managers
FC Spartak Ivano-Frankivsk players
SC Lutsk players
FC Spartak Ivano-Frankivsk managers
FC Prykarpattia Ivano-Frankivsk (2004) managers
FC Enerhetyk Burshtyn managers
FC Kalush managers
Association football forwards
Sportspeople from Ivano-Frankivsk Oblast